Carl Keesee is an American recording artist, songwriter, and musician. He was born in Oklahoma but moved to Canada. He is best known as a bassist, but has also performed as a clarinetist and vocalist. He has been a member of the bands Lazarus (with Billie Hughes and Gary Dye) Florida Razors and the Austin Music Band. He has also performed with David Bradstreet and Jane Siberry.

References

American rock bass guitarists
American clarinetists
American rock songwriters
American emigrants to Canada
Living people
Year of birth missing (living people)